The 1991–92 Segunda División season saw 20 teams participate in the second flight Spanish league. Celta de Vigo and Rayo Vallecano were promoted to Primera División. Real Murcia, CD Málaga, Real Avilés and UD Las Palmas were relegated to Segunda División B.

Teams

Final table

Results

Promotion playoff

First Leg

Second Leg 

Segunda División seasons
2
Spain